Marsilly is the name of the following communes in France:

 Marsilly, Charente-Maritime, in the Charente-Maritime department
 Marsilly, Moselle, in the Moselle department